Lu Qiongxian (盧瓊仙,  10th-century), was a Chinese imperial concubine.

She was the concubine of Liu Chang (Southern Han), who ruled in 958–972.   As the Emperor was not interested in politics, he left the state affairs to Lu Qiongxian, who managed them with the eunuchs Gong Chengshu and Chen Yanshou.

References 

10th-century Chinese women
10th-century Chinese people
Chinese concubines
Royal favourites
10th-century politicians
Year of birth missing
Year of death missing